Stařechovice is a municipality and village in Prostějov District in the Olomouc Region of the Czech Republic. It has about 500 inhabitants.

Administrative parts
The village of Služín is an administrative part of Stařechovice.

References

Villages in Prostějov District